Archierato maugeriae is a species of small sea snail, a marine gastropod mollusk in the family Eratoidae, the false cowries or trivias and allies.

Distribution
This species occurs in the Caribbean Sea from Florida, USA to Panama.

Description
The maximum recorded shell length is 6 mm.

Habitat
Minimum recorded depth is 1.5 m. Maximum recorded depth is 120 m.

References

External links
 Sowerby, G. B. I. (1832-1837). Cypraea, Erato, Ovulum. In: The Conchological Illustrations. London. Parts 1-8, 101-131. Catalogue and index, 20 pp
 Rosenberg, G.; Moretzsohn, F.; García, E. F. (2009). Gastropoda (Mollusca) of the Gulf of Mexico, Pp. 579–699 in: Felder, D.L. and D.K. Camp (eds.), Gulf of Mexico–Origins, Waters, and Biota. Texas A&M Press, College Station, Texas
 Fehse D. & Simone L.R.L. (2020). Contributions to the knowledge of the Eratoidae. X. Revision of the genus Archierato Schilder, 1933 (Mollusca: Gastropoda). Zootaxa. 4851(1): 81-110

Eratoidae
Gastropods described in 1832
Taxa named by John Edward Gray